Acalyptris pistaciae is a moth of the family Nepticulidae. It is found in the eastern Mediterranean region, where it is widespread in Greece (mainland as well as the islands), Cyprus and Turkey. It is probably also present in Syria and Lebanon. Mines collected in Israel in 1931 and identified as Simplimorpha promissa may also belong to be this species.

The wingspan is 3.7-5.3 mm. There are two or more generations per year.

The larvae feed on Pistacia lentiscus and Pistacia terebinthus. They mine the leaves of their host plant. The mine in Pistacia lentiscus consists of an extremely narrow gallery filled with frass. The thin part is more than half the total length of the mine. Later the mine widens gradually and becomes more contorted, with blackish or brownish frass coiled or in loose pellets filling about two thirds of mine width. The exit hole is located on the leaf upperside. Mines in the thinner leaves of Pistacia terebinthus consist of a narrow gallery throughout. The gallery gradually widens with the frass leaving clear margins, occasionally the frass line becomes wider.

External links
Acalyptris Meyrick: revision of the platani and staticis groups in Europe and the Mediterranean (Lepidoptera: Nepticulidae)
bladmineerders.nl

Nepticulidae
Moths of Europe
Moths of Asia
Moths described in 2007